Zain Sam Westbrooke (born 28 October 1996) is an English professional footballer who plays as a central midfielder. He is a graduate of the Brentford academy and made his professional breakthrough with Coventry City, before transferring to Bristol Rovers in 2020.

Career

Brentford 
Westbrooke began his career in the academy at Chelsea, before moving to West London neighbours Brentford in 2011 and signing scholarship forms at the end of the 2012–13 season. By the completion of his scholarship in April 2015, he had made 55 appearances and scored four goals for the youth team, in addition to scoring two goals in eight matches for the Development Squad during the 2014–15 season. Westbrooke signed a one-year Development Squad contract for the 2015–16 season and by November 2015 he had impressed sufficiently to sign a one-year extension. He finished the 2015–16 season with 23 appearances and one goal.

Westbrooke was named captain of the new B team for the 2016–17 season and signed a new one-year contract on 17 February 2017. He topped the B team's appearance-chart during the 2016–17 season, making 38 appearances and scoring six goals. He also voted the B Team Players' Player of the Year. Westbrooke was called into the first team squad for the final two matches of the 2016–17 season and made his debut in the West London derby with Fulham as a 76th-minute substitute for Konstantin Kerschbaumer on 29 April 2017.

Mounting injuries led to Westbrooke's inclusion on the first team bench for a league match versus Ipswich Town on 19 August 2017, but he remained an unused substitute during the 2–0 defeat. Westbrooke subsequently spent much of the first half of the 2017–18 season away on loan at National League clubs Solihull Moors and Leyton Orient, for both of whom he appeared sparingly. After his return on 10 January 2018, Westbrooke spent the remainder of the 2017–18 season with the B team. He departed Griffin Park on 10 May 2018, having made just one first team appearance.

Coventry City 
On 10 May 2018, Westbrooke joined Coventry City on a two-year contract on a free transfer, with the option of a further year, effective 1 July 2018. The club's victory in the 2018 League Two play-off Final, after the announcement of his transfer, meant that he began his time with the club in League One. After a substitute appearance in an EFL Trophy group stage match, Westbrooke made his full debut for the club with a start in a 1–0 win over Southend United on 29 December 2018. He had a short run in the team in late-January and early-February 2019 and finished the 2018–19 season with eight appearances.

Westbrooke broke into the team and made 33 appearances and scored four goals during the truncated 2019–20 season, which ended with promotion to the Championship as League One champions. After making 41 appearances and scoring four goals during his two seasons with Coventry City, Westbrooke transferred out of the club in August 2020.

Bristol Rovers
On 3 August 2020, Westbrooke signed a three-year contract with League One club Bristol Rovers for an undisclosed fee. He made 49 appearances and scored three goals during a 2020–21 season which culminated in relegation to League Two. After appearing in the first two matches of the 2021–22 season, manager Joey Barton dropped Westbrooke from the matchday squad and revealed that he was free to leave the club. A move did not materialise before the end of the summer transfer window and Westbrooke remained at the Memorial Stadium. He made a further seven appearances, predominantly in cup competitions, before joining League Two club Stevenage on loan until the end of the 2021–22 season on 17 January 2022. Westbrooke made 12 appearances during his spell and in his absence, Bristol Rovers were automatically promoted back to League One.

Returning to the Memorial Stadium for the 2022–23 pre-season, manager Joey Barton stated that Westbrooke's performances in training and matches had "done nothing but enhance his claim" for a first team place. Though he started in the opening match of the regular season versus Forest Green Rovers, Westbrooke was subsequently barred from first team training and was told he was free to leave the club. A move did not materialise before the end of the summer transfer window. After making just two EFL Trophy appearances since the opening day of the season, Westbrooke's contract was terminated by mutual consent on 23 January 2023. He made 61 appearances and scored four goals during  years at the Memorial Stadium.

Free agent 
On 8 February 2023, it was reported that Westbrooke was training with League Two club Walsall.

Personal life 
Westbrooke attended Woking High School. In December 2020, Westbrooke tested positive for COVID-19 and missed one match.

Career statistics

Honours 
Coventry City

 EFL League One: 2019–20

Individual
 Brentford B Players' Player of the Year: 2016–17

References

External links 

Living people
English footballers
Sportspeople from Chertsey
Footballers from Surrey
1996 births
Association football midfielders
Brentford F.C. players
Solihull Moors F.C. players
Leyton Orient F.C. players
Coventry City F.C. players
Bristol Rovers F.C. players
Stevenage F.C. players
English Football League players
National League (English football) players